Ryan Danielle Torrero Rojas (born 1 September 1990), known as Ryann Torrero, is an American-born Chilean footballer who plays as a goalkeeper for Santiago Morning and the Chile women's national team.

Career
In high school, Torrero played for the Crusaders of Village Christian School, where she was the team captain as a senior and a two-time CIF first-team selection. She also played for the Real So Cal youth team, where she won the San Diego Surf Cup, the Coast Soccer League's Premier League and the Super Y League. In college, she played in two matches for the Wyoming Cowgirls in 2008. She took a medical redshirt for her 2009 season before transferring to Campbell University, where she played for the Lady Camels from 2010 to 2012. She made 37 appearances for the Lady Camels, and was included in the Atlantic Sun All-Academic Team in 2010.

Torrero has appeared for the Chile women's national team, including in a friendly match against Colombia on 16 May 2019. She was included in Chile's squad for the 2019 FIFA Women's World Cup in France, though she did not make an appearance.

Torrero has also worked as a volunteer assistant coach for the Pepperdine Waves women's soccer team since 2017.

Personal life
Torrero is a native of Burbank, California. Her father was born in Chicago and is of Spanish descent. She was eligible to play for Chile through her mother, who emigrated from Santiago in her youth. In 2016, Torrero was in a severe traffic collision on U.S. Route 101 near Camarillo, which put her career on hiatus after suffering head, back and hip injuries. She also works as a model.

References

External links
 

1990 births
Living people
Citizens of Chile through descent
Chilean women's footballers
Women's association football goalkeepers
FC Neunkirch players
Santiago Morning (women) footballers
Swiss Women's Super League players
Chile women's international footballers
2019 FIFA Women's World Cup players
Chilean people of American descent
Chilean people of Spanish descent
Naturalized citizens of Chile
Chilean expatriate women's footballers
Chilean expatriate sportspeople in Switzerland
Expatriate women's footballers in Switzerland
Chilean football managers
Sportspeople from Burbank, California
Soccer players from California
American women's soccer players
Wyoming Cowgirls soccer players
Campbell Lady Camels soccer players
Chicago Red Stars players
American people of Chilean descent
Sportspeople of Chilean descent
American people of Spanish descent
Sportspeople of Spanish descent
American expatriate women's soccer players
American expatriate sportspeople in Switzerland
American women's soccer coaches
Los Angeles Strikers players
USL W-League (1995–2015) players